The little woolly mouse opossum (Marmosa phaea) is a nocturnal, arboreal and mainly solitary South American marsupial of the family Didelphidae. It is native to the western slopes of the Andes in Colombia, Ecuador and Peru, where it lives at altitudes from sea level to 1500 m. It primarily inhabits lowland rainforest and montane cloud forest, although it has been reported from dry forest in the southern end of its range. It was formerly assigned to the genus Micoureus, which was made a subgenus of Marmosa in 2009. Its conservation status is Vulnerable, due to habitat fragmentation and continuing loss of habitat via urbanization and conversion to agriculture.

References

Opossums
Mammals of Colombia
Mammals of Ecuador
Mammals of Peru
Mammals described in 1899
Taxa named by Oldfield Thomas

es:Micoureus#Micoureus phaeus